Richland Township is one of the thirteen townships of Fairfield County, Ohio, United States. As of the 2010 census the population was 2,195, of whom 1,759 lived in the unincorporated portions of the township.

Geography
Located in the eastern part of the county, it borders the following townships:
Thorn Township, Perry County - north
Reading Township, Perry County - east
Rush Creek Township - south
Pleasant Township - west
Walnut Township - northwest

Two villages are located in Richland Township: Rushville in the southeast, and West Rushville in the southwest.

Name and history
Richland Township was so named for the fertile soil within its borders. It is one of twelve Richland Townships statewide.

Government
The township is governed by a three-member board of trustees, who are elected in November of odd-numbered years to a four-year term beginning on the following January 1. Two are elected in the year after the presidential election and one is elected in the year before it. There is also an elected township fiscal officer, who serves a four-year term beginning on April 1 of the year after the election, which is held in November of the year before the presidential election. Vacancies in the fiscal officership or on the board of trustees are filled by the remaining trustees.

References

External links
Richland Township official website
County website

Townships in Fairfield County, Ohio
Townships in Ohio